The 2008 United States House of Representatives elections in New York were held on November 8, 2022, to elect the 29 U.S. representatives from the State of New York, one from each of the state's 29 congressional districts. state of New York in the United States House of Representatives. New York has 29 seats in the House, apportioned according to the 2000 United States Census. Representatives are elected for two-year terms; those elected will serve in the 111th Congress from January 4, 2009 until January 3, 2011. The election coincided with the 2008 U.S. presidential election in which Democrat Barack Obama defeated Republican John McCain by a wide margin.

The districts with congressional races not forecast as "safe" for the incumbent party were New York's congressional districts 13, 19, 20, 24, 25, 26 and 29.

The Democratic Party gained three seats in New York's congressional delegation in the 2008 elections. In New York's 13th congressional district, Democrat Michael McMahon defeated Robert Straniere to win the seat vacated by Republican Rep. Vito Fossella. In New York's 25th congressional district, Democrat Dan Maffei defeated Republican Dale Sweetland to win the seat vacated by Republican Rep. Jim Walsh. In New York's 29th congressional district, Democrat Eric Massa defeated incumbent Republican Rep. Randy Kuhl. Beginning in 2009, New York's congressional delegation consisted of a lopsided 26 Democrats and 3 Republicans.

Overview

Votes by district
Candidates on multiple ballot lines are marked as the party they caucus with.

Seat allocation
Votes are marked under party the candidate caucuses with, regardless of ballot line.

District 1

The 1st district is based on the eastern end and North Shore of Long Island, including the Hamptons, the North Fork, Riverhead, Port Jefferson, Smithtown, and Brookhaven, all in Suffolk County. Due to redistricting, the district lost minimal territory, instead picking up more territory around the towns of King's Park and Smithtown from the 2nd district. The 1st district has a PVI of R+3 but voted for Barack Obama by 4 points in the concurring presidential election. The incumbent is Democrat Tim Bishop, who was reelected with 62.23% of the vote in 2006. On election day, Bishop defeated Republican nominee Lee Zeldin who would then defeat him in a rematch six years later.

Republican/Conservative nominee
Lee Zeldin, practicing lawyer in Smithtown, New York

Democratic/Independence/Working Families nominee
Tim Bishop, incumbent U.S. Representative since 2003 and former President of Southampton College

General election

Predictions

Results

District 2

The 2nd district is based on the western end and North Shore of Long Island, including Huntington, Northport, Islandia, Half Hollow, West Hills, and parts of Islip, all in Suffolk and Nassau Counties. Due to redistricting, the district lost substantial territory, losing most of Lindenhurst, Islip, and portions of the South Shore to the 3rd district while gaining more territory on the North Shore around Huntington and portions of Nassau County. The 2nd district has a PVI of R+3 but voted for Barack Obama by 3 points in the concurring presidential election. The incumbent is Democrat Steve Israel, who was reelected with 70.42% of the vote in 2006. On election day Israel defeated Republican nominee Frank Stalzer.

Republican/Conservative nominee
Frank Stalzer, businessman

Democratic/Independence/Working Families nominee
Steve Israel, incumbent U.S. Representative since 2001, former member of the Huntington Town Council, and former staff member for U.S. Representative Richard Ottinger

General election

Predictions

Results

District 3

The 3rd district is based on the Gold Coast and Jones Beach portion of Long Island, including Glen Cove, Oyster Bay, Long Beach, Massapequa, Brookville, and parts of Islip, all in Suffolk and Nassau Counties. Due to redistricting, the district gained a large amount of territory, gaining in the southern portion of Nassau County around East Rockaway as well as a new portion of the district in Suffolk County, gaining Lindenhurst, Babylon, and portions of Islip, but lost areas around Interstate 495 in Plainview. The 3rd district has a PVI of D+2 but voted for Barack Obama by 8 points in the concurring presidential election. The incumbent is Republican Peter King, who was reelected with 56.04% of the vote in 2006. On election day King defeated Democratic nominee Graham Long.

Republican/Independence/Conservative nominee
Peter King, incumbent U.S. Representative since 1993

Democratic/Working Families nominee
Graham Long, Economic Development Advisor for Nassau County

General election

Predictions

Results

District 4

The 3rd district is based on the Nassau South Shore and central Nassau portion of Long Island, including Mineola, Garden City, East Rockaway, Valley Stream, Freeport, and parts of Long Beach, all in Nassau County. Due to redistricting, the district gained a small amount of territory, gaining in the southern portion of Nassau County around East Rockaway and Freeport but lost areas around Levittown. The 3rd district has a PVI of D+5 but voted for Barack Obama by 11 points in the concurring presidential election. The incumbent is Democrat Carolyn McCarthy, who was reelected with 64.92% of the vote in 2006. On election day McCarthy defeated Republican nominee Jack Martins.

Republican/Conservative nominee
Jack Martins, Mayor of Mineola since 2003

Democratic/Independence/Working Families nominee
Carolyn McCarthy, incumbent U.S. Representative since 1997

General election

Predictions

Results

District 5

District 6

District 7

District 8

District 9

District 10

District 11

District 12

District 13

Republican incumbent Vito Fossella announced his retirement on May 20, 2008, leaving this an open seat. Democratic City Councilman Michael McMahon, endorsed by the Staten Island Democratic Party won the primary against Steve Harrison, who lost to Fossella in 2006. Republican Robert Straniere defeated Dr. Jamshad Wyne in the Republican primary. CQ Politics forecasted the race as 'Democrat Favored'. McMahon defeated Straniere in the general election.
 Race ranking and details from CQ Politics
 Campaign contributions from OpenSecrets

District 14

District 15

District 16

District 17

District 18

District 19

Democratic incumbent John Hall was challenged by Republican Kieran Lalor. CQ Politics forecasted the race as 'Democrat Favored'. Hall won the election.

 Race ranking and details from CQ Politics
 Campaign contributions from OpenSecrets

District 20

Democratic incumbent Kirsten Gillibrand was challenged by Republican Sandy Treadwell. CQ Politics forecast race as 'Leans Democratic.' Gillibrand won easily.
 Race ranking and details from CQ Politics
 Campaign contributions from OpenSecrets

This was incumbent Democrat Kirsten Gillibrand's first run for re-election, and was one of the most expensive House races in the nation, with both campaigns spending a total of more than $9 million. Gillibrand had defeated Republican Congressman John Sweeney in an upset in 2006.

Representative Gillibrand faced businessmen Morris Guller in the Democratic primary due, it was said, to her support for a supplemental appropriation for the Iraq conflict. Gilibrand won the primary by a wide margin.

Those who would have run in the 2008 Republican primary to face Gillibrand had there been one:
 Lt. Colonel Michael Rocque, US Army (retired)
 Sandy Treadwell, former New York Republican State Committee chairman
 John Wallace, New York State Police (retired)

Treadwell, with the backing of the State Conservative Party and the GOP, filed Requests for Judicial Intervention to disqualify Wallace and Rocque from the primary.  He succeeded, and became the sole opponent of Kirsten Gillibrand.

Gillibrand faced Republican Sandy Treadwell, former Secretary of State for New York. On October 10, 2008, the Cook Report listed the 20th District as "Likely Democratic". Gillibrand won the November 4, 2008 election with 62% of the vote to Treadwell's 38%.

District 21

The 21st district is based on based in the Capital Region, including Albany, Troy, Schenectady, Guilderland, Johnstown, Amsterdam, Colonie, Cohoes, and Waterford. It includes all of Albany, Schenectady, Schoharie, Montgomery counties, and parts of Rensselaer, Saratoga, and Fulton Counties. Due to redistricting, the district gained a large amount of territory, gaining the entirety of Schoharie and Montgomery Counties, as well as the cities of Johnstown and Gloversville, and territory in southern Rensselaer County around East Greenbush and Castleton-On-The-Hudson. The 21st district has a PVI of R+9 but voted for Barack Obama by 18 points in the concurring presidential election. The incumbent is Democrat Michael McNulty, who was reelected with 78.19% of the vote in 2006. He is retiring. On election day, Tonko defeated Republican nominee Jim Buhrmaster.

Republican/Conservative nominee
Jim Buhrmaster, Member of the Schenectady County Legislature from District 3

Eliminated in primary 
Steven Vasquez, Ron Paul supporter

Primary results

Democratic/Working Families nominee
Paul D. Tonko, Member of the New York State Assembly from the 105th State Assembly district since 1983

Eliminated in primary 
M. Tracey Brooks, Democratic nominee for 108th State Assembly district in 2002
Phillip G. Steck, Member of the Albany County Legislature for the 15th district since 1999 and Colonie Town Democratic chairman
Darius Shahinfar
Joseph P. Sullivan, perennial candidate

Declined 
Neil Breslin, Member of the New York State Senate from the 46th State Senate district since 1997

Endorsements

Primary results

General election

Predictions

Results

District 22

District 23

The 23rd district is based in the North Country and the Adirondack Mountains, including Plattsburgh, Potsdam, Fort Drum, Watertown, Oswego, and parts of Saranac Lake. It includes all of Clinton, Franklin, St. Lawrence, Hamilton, Lewis, Jefferson, Oswego, and Madison counties and parts of Fulton, Oneida, and Essex counties. Due to redistricting, the district was renumbered from the 24th to the 23rd and changed a small amount of territory, gaining in portions of Essex County around the Adirondack Mountains as well as a new portion of the district in Oneida County, gaining the towns around the cities of Rome and Utica, and gained the entirety of Madison County, but lost its portion of Herkimer County entirely and the cities of Gloversville and Amsterdam in Fulton County. The 23rd district has a PVI of R+2 but voted for Barack Obama by 1 point in the concurring presidential election. The incumbent is Republican John McHugh, who was reelected with 63.15% of the vote in 2006. On election day, McHugh defeated Democratic nominee Michael Oot.

Republican nominee
John McHugh, incumbent U.S. Representative since 1993

Democratic nominee
Michael Oot, Attorney

General election

Predictions

Results

District 24

The 24th district is based in central New York and parts of the Finger Lakes region, including Rome, Utica, Oneonta, Norwich, Auburn, and parts of Binghamton. It includes all of Herkimer, Cortland, Chenango, and Seneca counties and parts of Tompkins, Tioga, Broome, Ontario, Otsego, and Oneida counties. Due to redistricting, the district was renumbered from the 23rd to the 24th and changed large amounts of territory, gaining the entirety of Cortland, Herkimer, and Seneca Counties. The district lost all of its territory in Schoharie, Delaware, and Montgomery counties and lost portions of Oneida county north of the city of Rome. The district now had territory stretching into western New York, gaining portions of Cayuga, Tioga, Tompkins, and Ontario counties. The 24th district has a PVI of R+11 but voted for Barack Obama by 3 points in the concurring presidential election. The incumbent is Democrat Michael Arcuri, who was elected with 53.95% of the vote in 2006. On election day, Arcuri defeated Republican nominee Richard Hannah.

Republican/Conservative/Independence nominee
Richard Hanna, CEO of Hanna Construction

Democratic/Working Families nominee
Michael Arcuri, incumbent U.S. Representative since 2007

General election

District 25

Republican incumbent James T. Walsh retired, leaving this an open seat. Democrat Dan Maffei ran against Republican Dale Sweetland who won in a crowded primary race, and frequent candidate Howie Hawkins (who used the "Green Populist" label). CQ Politics forecasted the race as 'Leans Democratic'. Maffei won the election.
 Race ranking and details from CQ Politics
 Campaign contributions from OpenSecrets

The New York 25th congressional district election for the 111th Congress was held on November 4, 2008. The race featured Democratic Party nominee Dan Maffei, who narrowly lost to incumbent Jim Walsh for the same seat in 2006, Republican Party nominee Dale Sweetland, former Chairman of the Onondaga County Legislature, and Green Party nominee Howie Hawkins, Green Party founder and frequent political candidate.

Maffei defeated Sweetland decisively, 55% to 42%, becoming the first Democrat to represent the district since 1981.

On January 24, 2008, Republican incumbent Jim Walsh announced he would not be running for an eleventh term. Walsh's 2006 Democratic challenger Dan Maffei had already announced his candidacy to challenge the seat in 2008, and had mounted a strong campaign. In March 2008, after Democratic Syracuse Mayor Matt Driscoll announced he would not be running for the seat, Maffei was virtually assured of the Democratic nomination, and ran unopposed in the Democratic primary on September 9. After it appeared he might run unopposed in the general election, on April 2 Republican Dale Sweetland, coming off a narrowly unsuccessful September 2007 bid for Onondaga County Executive, announced he'd oppose Maffei. Other Republicans followed suit, but Sweetland won the crowded primary and received the party nomination in May 2008.

Maffei was heavily favored to win the seat, and lead heavily in campaign contributions.  In addition to rating the district as "Leans Democratic", RealClearPolitics ranked this as the third most likely Congressional district to switch parties. Going into the election, other pundits from CQ Politics, The Cook Report, and the Rothenberg Report are also ranking it as "Lean Democrat" to "Democrat Favored". In May 2008, and again on June 20, 2008, The Washington Post'''s Chris Cillizza, author of "The Fix", ranked the race as the #1 Congressional race to turn over from a "Red" seat to a "Blue" seat 2008.Chris Cillizza. "Generic Ballot Distress for House GOP", "The Fix", The Washington Post, June 20, 2008. Retrieved on June 28, 2008.  Although Walsh had held it without serious difficulty before his near-defeat in 2006, the 25th had swung heavily to the Democrats at most other levels since the 1990s.  The last Republican presidential candidate to carry the district was George H. W. Bush in 1988.

On November 4 Maffei defeated Sweetland, 55% to 42%.  He will be the first Democrat to represent the area since 1981 (when it was the 32nd District).

District 26

Republican incumbent Thomas M. Reynolds retired, leaving this an open seat. In an upset victory, Amherst environmental lawyer Alice Kryzan won the Democratic primary against Iraq War veteran Jonathan Powers and maverick millionaire Jack Davis. The Republican nominee was businessman Christopher Lee. CQ Politics forecasted the race as 'Leans Republican'. Lee prevailed.

Republican businessman Christopher J. Lee (R) won the seat running against Democratic lawyer Alice Kryzan (148,607 to 109,615), even though several analysts rated the race as a toss-up or leaning Democratic.2008 Competitive House Race Chart  The Cook Political Report, October 15, 2008

Alice Kryzan, an environmental attorney, won the Democratic party primary election on Tuesday, September 9, 2008. She ran against Jon Powers, an Iraq war vet and the endorsed Democratic candidate, as well as wealthy industrialist Jack Davis. The primary was notable for its large negative ad content, most heavily by self-financed Davis against Powers. Kryzan upset the conventional wisdom with a surprise win, partially on the strength of a last-minute TV ad characterizing the other two candidates as squabbling. A major selling point Kryzan used was that both of her primary rivals were former Republicans. Powers remained on the Working Families Party ballot line despite endorsing Kryzan and attempting to get himself removed after having moved out of state. The Republican party brought a lawsuit to prevent the line from being given to Kryzan. However, the presence of Powers on the ballot made no difference to the outcome of the race as the number of votes his ballot line received was much smaller than the margin of victory for Lee.

Republican Chris Lee was the only candidate running for the party nomination and was endorsed by incumbent Representative Tom Reynolds. Operatives within the party also reportedly tried to recruit several other high-profile candidates, including WIVB-TV anchor Don Postles, a registered independent, which led to Postles having to issue an on-air rejection of their efforts.

District 27

Democrat Brian Higgins easily defeated Independence Party candidate Dan Humiston. The Republicans did not put forth a candidate, instead cross-endorsing Humiston. Higgins won the general election.

District 28

District 29

Democratic nominee Eric Massa defeated Republican incumbent Randy Kuhl, following his unsuccessful 2006 run against Kuhl.

Two-term incumbent Randy Kuhl (R) had been elected to Congress with 52% of the popular vote over Democratic candidate Eric Massa in a two-way race in 2006.  In March 2006, citing his frustration with actions at the in-patient mental health care hospital at the Canandaigua VA center, former Democratic candidate, and a long-time friend of 2004 presidential candidate General Wesley Clark, Eric J.J. Massa  filed to run as the Democratic candidate again in 2008.   In May 2007, Pittsford businessman David Nachbar, a senior vice-president of Bausch & Lomb, also announced his candidacy as a Democratic candidate for the same seat. As of a post on April 18, 2007, from Massa on DailyKos, the DCCC placed a requirement on their support for any candidate relied upon that candidate  having $300K cash-on-hand by the end of the second quarter 2007 (June 30). In August 2007, Nachbar announced that he was withdrawing from the race, with news reports stating that a letter to supporters suggest his role as Senior VP of Human Resources for Bausch & Lomb during a buyout via hedge fund Warburg Pinkus rendered him unable to campaign effectively.  Prior to Nachbar's announcement, Massa's campaign announced in a press release, that he had received all of the County endorsements of the 29th District and all of the townships in Monroe County, but had yet to secure the Monroe Democratic Committee endorsement.

A native of the 29th District, Congressman Randy Kuhl has lived in the area all of his life. The son of a doctor and a nurse/teacher, Randy was born in Bath, picked grapes and worked inside the wineries on the shores of Keuka Lake, attended school in Hammondsport, had summer jobs in construction and on several different farms during his college years. He owned and operated a business in Bath, became Steuben County attorney, then successfully ran for the New York State Assembly in 1980, the New York State Senate in 1986, and the U.S. House of Representatives in 2004 where he now serves and represents the people of the 29th District. Randy Kuhl is a graduate of Hammondsport Central School, and earned a B.S. in Civil Engineering from Union College (1966), and in 1969 received his Juris Doctor from Syracuse University College of Law. He is a communicant of St. James Episcopal Church and has been active in the Hammondsport Rotary Club and BPOE 1547 in Bath. He is a member of the Advisory Committee of the Five Rivers Council of the Boy Scouts of America, the Branchport Rod and Gun Club, and the executive committee of the Steuben County Republican Committee. He is President of the Board of Directors of the Reginald Wood Scouting Memorial and an immediate past member of the Board of Directors of the Alliance for Manufacturing and Technology. Randy Kuhl currently lives in Hammondsport and is the father of three sons.

Eric Massa was the Democratic nominee in 2006. He attended the U.S. Naval Academy at Annapolis and went on to serve in the Navy for 24 years. He eventually served as aide to former NATO Supreme Allied Commander, General Wesley Clark. Near the end of his Navy career he was diagnosed with Non-Hodgkin lymphoma, a disease he was able to survive. A former Republican, he claims he left his party over the issue of the Iraq War and campaigned in New Hampshire during the campaign of his former-boss, Wesley Clark's, failed presidential bid. During the 2006 campaign, Massa positioned himself as strongly opposed to the Iraq war and unrestricted "free trade," favoring instead "fair trade". Other issues in his platform included expanding farm aid programs, as well as bringing homeland security money to the 29th District.  Massa is also active in Band of Brothers/Veterans for a Secure America whose goal is to help veterans who are running for Congress as Democrats. Massa has recently worked as a "business consultant" for Strategic Insight, a defense consulting firm in Alexandra, Virginia.  Massa, during a press conference in June, 2007, stated that he has since "curtailed all other activities in April (2007) when he became an active candidate". Massa lives in Corning, New York with his wife Beverly, daughter Alexandra and son Justin.  His eldest son Richard lives in California.

David Nachbar is Bausch & Lomb's senior vice president for Human Resources. He was named to this post in October 2002. Nachbar joined Bausch & Lomb from The St. Paul Companies, Inc., where he was senior vice president for Human Resources. Previously, he was vice president for Human Resources and chief of staff for Asia for Citibank. He also held Human Resources posts with PepsiCo and Time Warner.  In 1996, Nachbar ran for New York State Senate as a Democrat and was unsuccessful. Nachbar received a Bachelor of Science degree in Industrial and Labor Relations from Cornell University in 1984.

On August 21, 2008, Massa attended a Kuhl press conference in the Corning City Hall.  After the press conference ended, the two candidates spoke for a minute in the hallway.  Massa challenged Kuhl to schedule debates and criticized him for not having accepted debate invitations from community leaders. After Massa left, Kuhl said he had not had time to schedule a debate.  Kuhl later issued a press release which criticized Massa for being "disrespectful" at the event, which Kuhl said "was not campaign related".  Councilman Dane Kane, a Democrat who also attended the press conference, joined in Massa's criticism, saying, "Kuhl has stopped his town hall meetings, won’t take questions from the public, and refuses to respond to invitations to debate the issues of the day."

 References 

External links
 New York State Board of Elections

 Campaign contributions for New York congressional races from OpenSecrets
 New York U.S. House of Representatives race from 2008 Race Tracker Official John Hall Campaign Site
 Official Kieran Lalor Campaign Site
 Official George Oros Campaign Site
 Race ranking and details from CQ Politics
 Race ranking and details from CQ Politics
 Campaign contributions from OpenSecrets
 The Cook Political Report (some content requires subscription)
 Campaign contributions at OpenSecrets
 Dan Maffei for U.S. Congress – campaign website
 
 Maffei's congressional salary data
 2006 Zogby Poll
 Race ranking and details from CQ Politics
 Campaign contributions from OpenSecrets
 Kryzan wins upset in Buffalo-area primary Newsday.com, September 9, 2008
 Race ranking and details from CQ Politics
 Campaign contributions from OpenSecrets
 Race ranking and details from CQ Politics
 Campaign contributions from OpenSecrets
 Horrigan, Marie Upset in Upstate New York CQ Politics, September 10, 2008
 2008 Competitive House Race Chart The Cook Political Report, October 15, 2008.
 2008 House Ratings The Rothenberg Political Report'', October 14, 2008
 Kuhl's campaign site
 Massa's campaign site
 Nachbar's campaign site
 Race ranking and details from CQ Politics
 Campaign contributions from OpenSecrets

2008
New York
United States House of Representatives